Kothapet is a major commercial and residential suburb in the city of Hyderabad, India located around a strip of NH65. It belongs to Maheshwaram constituency of Ranga Reddy district.

History 
Kothapet village was a gram panchayat until the passage of Government Order by the erstwhile Andhra Pradesh government wherein it was absorbed into the Hyderabad Metropolitan Development Authority region thereby subsuming the municipality into municipal corporation. The merger of the village into the municipality was challenged subsequently in a petition to the Telangana High Court, but was quashed due to lack of merits.

Economy 
Kothapet houses one of largest fruit markets in the state of Telangana, and is an upcoming real estate destination. Owing to the congestion due to local businesses, it was proposed that the market in Gaddiannaram be shifted to Koheda.

Transport 
The locality is served by TSRTC bus stops and Chaitanyapuri Metro Station of the Hyderabad Metro Rail Red Line Corridor.

Institutes
Hamstech Institute of Fashion & Interior Design is located here.

References 

Neighbourhoods in Hyderabad, India